The Pas River is located in the region of Cantabria in the northern part of Spain. The river flows through the autonomous community of Cantabria and empties into the Cantabric Sea.

See also 
 List of rivers of Spain

Rivers of Spain
Rivers of Cantabria